"Naturally" is a song performed by American band Selena Gomez & the Scene, taken from their debut studio album Kiss & Tell (2009). It was released by Hollywood Records as the album's second single in the United States and select other countries. The song was produced by Antonina Armato and Tim James who wrote the song with Devrim Karaoglu. Musically, "Naturally" is an uptempo dance-pop song which relies on electropop. The song's lyrics speak of a relationship in which feelings are not forced and the protagonist sings of their happiness. The song officially impacted US mainstream radio on January 19, 2010, and was released physically in numerous European countries thereafter.
The song also appears on the international standard edition of the band's 2010 sophomore album, A Year Without Rain.

"Naturally" received generally positive reviews, with critics complimenting its electro and club feel. The song reached the top ten in the United Kingdom, Slovakia, Hungary, and Ireland, and peaked in the top twenty in multiple other countries. As their first song to impact radio in the US, it reached number twenty-nine on the Billboard Hot 100, number twelve on the Pop Songs chart, and it topped the Hot Dance Club Play chart. It was later certified quadruple Platinum in the United States by the RIAA, Platinum in Canada by the CRIA, and Silver in the United Kingdom by the BPI. The song's accompanying music video sees Gomez sporting several different outfits and styles before a backdrop. Gomez & the Scene performed the song numerous times including on Dick Clark's New Year's Rockin' Eve with Ryan Seacrest among other televised events and live performances. The song was ranked number eighty-four on About.com's list of "Top 100 Pop Songs of 2010".

Composition and lyrics

"Naturally" is an dance-pop and electropop song which derives from the style of Hi-NRG while incorporating disco beats. Gomez described the song as "light", "energetic", and "poppy". The song is set in common time, and has an electro-pop tempo of 132 beats per minute. It is written in the key of B  minor, and Gomez's vocals span from the low note of F3 to high note of F5. It follows the chord progression Bm–G–A-Bm in the verses and Bm-G-D-A in the chorus. According to Chris Ryan of MTV News the song is influenced by Kylie Minogue. According to CBBC, The song is lyrically about meeting someone who is comfortable in their own skin, as the protagonist singing how happy they are to be with them. The lyrics also state that everything in the relationship comes "Naturally". In an interview with Digital Spy, Gomez said that the song was about "two people who have a connection with each other so they don't really have to force the feelings - they're just there." Overall, she said the song was a great representation of the whole album.

Critical reception
Bill Lamb of About.com ranked the song amongst the top tracks on Kiss & Tell. Mikael Wood of Billboard gave the song a positive review, stating that it "has a juicy and instantly memorable vocal hook". In a review of the album, Robert Copsey of Digital Spy coined the song "electro-thumping", commenting that it was "as innocent as the purity ring on Gomez's finger and showcases her polished vocals perfectly." Copsey also stated that the impressive hooks present in the song do not appear on the album anywhere else. In a single review, Nick Levine also of Digital Spy said was the most Disney-affiliated single with club appeal since Miley Cyrus' "See You Again". When commenting on whether Gomez would be a mainstay in music, Levine said, "It's too soon to tell - but most Scando-popettes would dye their locks brunette for this tune." Although stating that it was very cliche, a writer for Popjustice said that the song "seems like a boundary-smashing avant garde curiosity when you put it alongside most other Hollywood Records output." Bill Lamb of About.com ranked "Naturally" at number eighty-four on his list of "Top 100 Pop Songs of 2010".

Chart performance
After debuting its first week at sixty-five on Billboard's US Hot Digital Songs, holiday sales for the single subsequently pushed the song to jump to thirty-four. These digital sales made the song the "Hot Shot Debut" on the Billboard Hot 100 at number thirty-nine for the issue dated January 9, 2010, eventually rising to twenty-nine on the Hot 100 and eighteen on the Canadian Hot 100. On the week labeled February 13, 2010, due to radio impact, the song debuted at forty on the US Pop Songs chart, and was the Hot Shot Debut at thirty-nine on the Hot Dance/Club Play Songs chart where it peaked at number one. The song was certified Platinum on July 15, 2010, in the United States by the Recording Industry Association of America for reaching a million in sales, and 4 times Platinum on July 23, 2014, for sales and streaming.  As of August 2014, the single had sold 2,006,000 copies. It was also certified Platinum in Canada by the Canadian Recording Industry Association for sales of 80,000 units.

"Naturally" debuted at forty-six on the Australian Singles Chart and at twenty on the New Zealand Singles Chart.

In the United Kingdom, "Naturally" entered and peaked on the UK Singles Chart at number seven, the first top ten single for a Disney Channel star since Hilary Duff with her 2005 single "Wake Up" which also charted at number seven. In January 2021, it was certified Silver by the British Phonographic Industry for sales and streams exceeding 200,000. The song additionally charted in several European countries, appearing in the top ten of Ireland and Hungary, and elsewhere in charts in Austria, Germany, and Belgium, and Switzerland, among others. The chartings in European countries propelled the song to peak at nineteen on the European Hot 100.

Music video

The music video was filmed November 14, 2009, and premiered on Disney Channel following the December 11, 2009, airing of Phineas and Ferb Christmas Vacation. The special effects of the video are more complex than that of the band's first single, "Falling Down". Lead singer Gomez said, "The video is very different from any other video that I've done," and added, "it has a lot more fierce clothes and a lot of fun colors." Two alternate video versions were released for the Ralphi Rosario Remix and the Dave Audé Remix. The video features Gomez sporting different outfits and appearing on black, red, and pink backdrops with the band performing the song. The music video was directed by Chris Dooley. Chris Ryan of MTV News called Gomez a "dancing queen" and said that she "seems cool and confident throughout the video."

Track listing

Naturally (The Remixes) EP (US)
"Naturally" (Radio Edit) – 3:08
"Naturally" (Dave Audé Radio Remix) – 4:01
"Naturally" (Ralphi Rosario Radio Remix) – 3:39
"Naturally" (Disco Fries Radio Remix) – 3:57

UK iTunes single
"Naturally" (UK radio mix) – 3:05
"Naturally" (Instrumental) – 3:22

UK Remixes EP
"Naturally" (Original Edit) - 3:10
"Naturally" (Dave Audé Club Mix) – 7:43
"Naturally" (Dave Audé Dub) - 7:23
"Naturally" (Ralphi Rosario Extended Mix) – 9:09
"Naturally" (Ralphi Rosario Big Dub) - 8:50
"Naturally" (Disco Fries Extended Mix) – 5:28
"Naturally" (Disco Fries Dub) - 5:51

German CD single
"Naturally" – 3:08
"Kiss & Tell" – 3:17

Credits and personnel 
Recording and Management
 Mastered at Capitol Mastering (Los Angeles, California)
 Antonina Songs (ASCAP), Akashic Field Music (BMI), Mafia Della Roccia o/b/o Itself, Devrim Music (BMI). Rights for Antonina Songs (ASCAP) administered by Downtown Music Publishing LLC.

Personnel

 Selena Gomez – lead vocals
 Antonina Armato – songwriter, producer
 Tim James – songwriter, producer, mixing
 Devrim Karaoglu – songwriter, co-producer
 Steve Hammons – engineering
 Nigel Lundemo – engineering
 Adam Comstock – second engineering
 Paul Palmer – mixing
 Jimmy Messer – guitars
 Brooke Adams – additional background vocals
 Robert Vosgien – mastering

Credits and personnel adapted from Kiss & Tell album liner notes.

Charts

Weekly charts

Year-end charts

Certifications

Release history

See also
 List of number-one dance singles of 2010 (U.S.)

References

External links
 
 
 
 

Selena Gomez & the Scene songs
Songs written by Tim James (musician)
Songs written by Antonina Armato
Hollywood Records singles
Song recordings produced by Rock Mafia
2009 songs
Songs written by Devrim Karaoglu
2009 singles